Les Thornton (9 April 1934 – 1 February 2019) was a British professional wrestler who competed in Great Britain, Japan, European and North American regional promotions throughout the 1970s and 1980s including Joint Promotions, Stampede Wrestling, the World Wrestling Federation and the National Wrestling Alliance.

Professional wrestling career
During his career, he was considered one of the best junior heavyweights in the world at one time simultaneously holding both the WWF and NWA World Junior Heavyweight titles, and would later hold NWA title five times. He had matches against Tiger Mask, Gino Hernandez, The Cobra, K J Anderssen, Dynamite Kid, Terry Taylor, Gerald Brisco, Al Madril and Tatsumi Fujinami. As a result of the hostile takeover by the WWF of Georgia Championship Wrestling, Thornton joined the WWF, but in the "Hogan Era" as it stood, Thornton was used as a jobber and would help develop young wrestlers, including Mick Foley. Near the end of his career, he formed his own promotion in Calgary called Canadian Independent Wrestling Federation (CIWF), which included wrestlers like Ricky Fuji and Big Titan, among others. Thornton was Mick Foley’s tag team partner in Foley's first ever WWF match against The British Bulldogs. Against heavyweights he fought Harley Race, Billy Robinson, Gene Lewis, Pedro Morales and Dory Funk Jr.  He was known for his stiff forearm uppercuts, over the knee backbreakers and suplexes.

Championships and accomplishments
All Japan Pro Wrestling
World's Strongest Tag Determination League Technique Award (1980) - with Billy Robinson
Championship Wrestling from Florida
NWA Florida Junior Heavyweight Championship (1 time)
Georgia Championship Wrestling
NWA Georgia Tag Team Championship (1 time) - with Tony Charles
Mid-Atlantic Championship Wrestling
NWA World Junior Heavyweight Championship (1 time)
Middle Atlantic States Wrestling
MASW National Heavyweight Championship (1 time)
National Wrestling Alliance
NWA World Junior Heavyweight Championship (6 times)1
NWA Big Time Wrestling
NWA Texas Tag Team Championship (1 time) - with Tony Charles
NWA Hollywood Wrestling
NWA Americas Heavyweight Championship (1 time)
NWA Mid-America
NWA World Junior Heavyweight Championship (1 time)
NWA New Zealand
NWA British Empire Commonwealth Heavyweight Championship (New Zealand version) (1 time)
Pacific Northwest Wrestling
NWA Pacific Northwest Tag Team Championship (1 time) - with Moondog Mayne
Pro Wrestling Illustrated
PWI ranked him # 320 of the 500 best singles wrestlers of the PWI Years in 2003
Ring Around The Northwest Newsletter
Tag Team of the Year (1977) with Lonnie Mayne
Southeastern Championship Wrestling
NWA World Junior Heavyweight Championship (1 time)
Stampede Wrestling
Stampede British Commonwealth Mid-Heavyweight Championship (1 time)
Stampede North American Heavyweight Championship (2 times)
Stampede Wrestling Hall of Fame (Class of 1995)
Western States Sports
NWA Western States Tag Team Championship (1 time) - with Jerry Kozak
World Wrestling Council
WWC World Junior Heavyweight Championship (2 times)
1Records are unclear as to where Thorton was when he received the title for the first time nor is it known as to which NWA affiliated promotion he was wrestling for at the time.

References

Further reading
Foley, Mick. Have A Nice Day: A Tale of Blood and Sweatsocks. New York: HarperCollins Publishers, 1999. 
Funk, Terry and Scott E. Williams. Terry Funk: The Hardcore Legend. Champaigne, Illinois: Sports Publishing LLC, 2005. 
Johnson, Weldon T. and Jim Wilson. Chokehold: Pro Wrestling's Real Mayhem Outside the Ring. Philadelphia: Xlibris Corporation, 2003. 
McCoy, Heath. Pain and Passion: The History of Stampede Wrestling. Toronto: CanWest Books, 2005.

External links
SLAM! Wrestling - Les Thornton: A life on the road by Greg Oliver
SLAM! Wrestling: Les Thornton - What you DIDN'T know! by Terry Taylor
 by Percival A. Friend
Championship Wrestling from Florida: Les Thornton
Profile at OWW

1934 births
2019 deaths
20th-century professional wrestlers
English male professional wrestlers
Stampede Wrestling alumni
NWA World Junior Heavyweight Champions
Stampede Wrestling British Commonwealth Mid-Heavyweight Champions
Stampede Wrestling North American Heavyweight Champions
NWA Americas Heavyweight Champions
NWA Georgia Tag Team Champions